Leucoagaricus sericifer is an agaric fungus in the genus Leucoagaricus. It was originally described as Pseudobaeospora sericifera by French mycologist Marcel Locquin. It is widespread in Europe.

See also

List of Leucoagaricus species

References

sericifer
Fungi described in 1952
Fungi of Europe
Taxa named by Marcel Locquin